The C31 is a secondary route in Namibia that runs 190 kilometers from the Okahandja at the B1 junction up north-westerly to Summerdown, Omaheke, where it meets the C29. 

The B2 road can be accessed from the B1, a few miles from the C31 junction.

References 

Roads in Namibia
Otjozondjupa Region
Omaheke Region